is a Japanese footballer currently playing as a right back for Aries FC Tokyo.

Club career
Having played in his native Japan with Tokyo 23 FC, Hashioka was announced as an Albirex Niigata Singapore player ahead of the 2020 season. After two years in Singapore, in which he was named captain for both, he returned to Japan to sign for Aries FC Tokyo.

Personal life
Kazuki is the older brother of Japanese international Daiki Hashioka.

Career statistics

Club

Notes

Honours

Albirex Niigata FC Singapore 

 Singapore Premier League:
 Champion: 2020
 Runner-up: 2021

References

1997 births
Living people
Association football people from Saitama Prefecture
Meiji University alumni
Japanese footballers
Japanese expatriate footballers
Association football defenders
Singapore Premier League players
Urawa Red Diamonds players
Tokyo 23 FC players
Albirex Niigata Singapore FC players
Japanese expatriate sportspeople in Singapore
Expatriate footballers in Singapore